The 1978 winners of the Torneo di Viareggio (in English, the Viareggio Tournament, officially the Viareggio Cup World Football Tournament Coppa Carnevale), the annual youth football tournament held in Viareggio, Tuscany, are listed below.

Format

The 16 teams are seeded in 4 groups. Each team from a group meets the others in a single tie. The winner of each group progress to the final knockout stage.

Participating teams
Italian teams

  Fiorentina
  Inter Milan
  Juventus
  Milan
  Napoli
  Perugia
  Roma
  Sampdoria

European teams

  OFK Beograd
  Dukla Praha
  Levski-Spartak
  Bastia
  Olympiacos
  Benfica
  Real Murcia

Asian teams
  Beijing Youth

Group stage

Group A

Group B

Group C

Group D

Knockout stage

Champions

Footnotes

External links
 Official Site (Italian)
 Results on RSSSF.com

1978
1977–78 in Italian football
1977–78 in Yugoslav football
1977–78 in French football
1977–78 in Spanish football
1977–78 in Czechoslovak football
1977–78 in Bulgarian football
1977–78 in Greek football
1978 in Chinese football